Manori Creek (also Malad Creek) is a creek (tidal channel) in northern Mumbai (Bombay), India.  It is also known as the Gorai Creek further north. The Dahisar River drains into this creek.

Estuaries of Mumbai